Tanner is one of the 35 constituencies in the Eastern District, Hong Kong.

The constituency returns one district councillor to the Eastern District Council, with an election every four years. The seat was last held by former Civic Party politician Cheng Tat-hung.

Tanner constituency is loosely based on the area around Tanner Garden and Bedford Gardens in North Point with estimated population of 15,959.

Councillors represented

Election results

2010s

2000s

1990s

Notes

References

North Point
Constituencies of Hong Kong
Constituencies of Eastern District Council
1994 establishments in Hong Kong
Constituencies established in 1994